Kiri Kasama is a Local Government Area of Jigawa State, Nigeria. Its headquarters are in the town of Kiri Kasama.
 
It has an area of 797 km and a population of 191,523 at the 2006 census.

The postal code of the area is 731.

The 1994 Nigeria Airways Flight 9805 crash occurred near Kiri Kasama.

References

Local Government Areas in Jigawa State